Arla Aylesbury is the largest dairy in the UK; at opening it was the world's biggest dairy, processing over 1.75 billion pints (1 billion litres) of milk per year, around 10% of the milk in the UK.

It is owned by Arla Foods UK which is a subsidiary of Arla Foods, a large producer of dairy products in Scandinavia.

History
The first investment proposal for the dairy came in November 2009. Planning permission was submitted in September 2011. Construction started in February 2012, by Caddick Construction. The plant was officially opened on 28 May 2014, with Åke Hantoft, the Chairman of Arla Foods, in attendance.

The UK dairy industry is worth around £3.7bn.

Production
It can process up to 420,000 pints (240,000 litres) of milk per hour. Arla Foods UK processes 6.1 billion pints (3.5 billion of litres) of milk per year, turning over £2.2bn. It has eight processing lines, with eight bottle sizes. Around 900 farmers supply milk to the site; Arla UK represents around 2,800 British dairy farmers.

It produces about five bottles per second and makes around 400 deliveries from the site each day. In despatch,  all the milk is transported by robots - it is the only dairy in the UK like this, working with RFID technology. Without robots, it would require around 300 workers in despatch. Around 30% of UK dairy farms have robotic systems. 

Arla in the UK makes around 43% of Britain's butter.

Structure
It is situated north of the A41 in Aylesbury Vale, and between this to the south and the Aylesbury Arm of the Grand Union Canal to the north. The total site is 70 acres.

See also
 CCE Wakefield, Europe's largest soft drinks factory, in West Yorkshire

References

External links
 Arla UK sites
 Food Processing Technology

2014 establishments in England
Arla Foods
Aylesbury Vale
Buildings and structures in Buckinghamshire
Commercial buildings completed in 2014
Dairy farming in the United Kingdom
Economy of Buckinghamshire
Food manufacturers of England